Raymond Weil Genève is a Swiss luxury watchmaker, founded in 1976 in Geneva. It is a family company founded by Raymond Weil and Simone Bédat.  Simone Bedat and her son left the company in 1996 to form Bedat_&_Co. Raymond Weil led the company until his retirement in 2002. Weil died in 2014 and the company is now managed by his grandson Elie Bernheim. 

Weil initially sold his designs from a foldout bridge table in a stall in Geneva. The line included both the traditional spring-powered and cog-and-gear mechanical Swiss watches and quartz-powered watches. He marketed the watches internationally towards lower-end luxury watch buyers.

In July 2018, Weli moved his head office into St Peter’s Square in Manchester.

See also 
Sellita-clock-mechanical-engine

References

External links 

Luxury brands
Swiss watch brands
Watch manufacturing companies of Switzerland
Manufacturing companies based in Geneva